"It's a Sin" is a song by English synth-pop duo Pet Shop Boys from their second studio album, Actually (1987). Written by Chris Lowe and Neil Tennant, the song was released on 15 June 1987 as the album's lead single. It became the duo's second number-one single on the UK Singles Chart, spending three weeks atop the chart. Additionally, the single topped the charts in Austria, Denmark, Finland, Germany, Ireland, Norway, Portugal, Spain, Sweden and Switzerland, while reaching number nine on the US Billboard Hot 100.

A demo of the track was first cut in 1984 with Bobby Orlando, and the song's form in the demo remained intact to the final version, although the released production is far more dramatic.

Writing and inspiration
In this song, Tennant describes some impressions he took from his time at the Catholic St Cuthbert's High School in Newcastle upon Tyne. He ended up feeling that everything he had done or was going to do was a sin. Tennant has said that he wrote the lyrics purging his emotions in a moment of frustration and anger, but that it was not something serious:

In the coda, Tennant recites a part of the Confiteor in Latin, which translated into English is "I confess to almighty God, and to you, my brothers, that I have sinned exceedingly in thought, word, act and omission, through my fault, through my fault, through my most grievous fault".

"'It’s a Sin', at its heart, is a heavy metal record," Tennant said. "There is a huge link between hi-NRG music and heavy metal: the urgency, the chords, the slightly histrionic melody." The dramatic, overblown production style of the song, loaded with synthesizers, orchestra hits and bookended by a non sequitur sample of a NASA countdown, has come to exemplify the most theatrical extremes of the Pet Shop Boys' musical style. It remains a concert staple, being one of only two songs (alongside "West End Girls") that has been played during every Pet Shop Boys tour.

The band stated at the time that they had been keen for Stock Aitken Waterman to produce the song, as they were huge fans. Neil has stated that Pete Waterman hated the demo, so they turned instead to SAW's remix engineer Phil Harding to remix the song for the US release (which went uncredited on the sleeve). They would work with him again on "I'm Not Scared", the single they wrote for the Patsy Kensit band Eighth Wonder and remixes of "Always on My Mind".

The Pet Shop Boys have been known to segue between "It’s a Sin" and Gloria Gaynor's "I Will Survive" at their concerts.

Controversy
At the time of the single's release, British DJ Jonathan King accused the Pet Shop Boys of plagiarising the melody for "It's a Sin" from Cat Stevens' 1971 song "Wild World". He made the claims in The Sun newspaper, for which he wrote a regular column during the 1980s. King went so far as to release his own cover version of "Wild World" as a single, using a similar musical arrangement to "It's a Sin", in an effort to demonstrate his claims. While the Pet Shop Boys sued King, this single flopped, eventually winning out-of-court damages, which they donated to charity.

Music video
Directed by Derek Jarman, the "It's a Sin" video marked the experimental director's first of several collaborations with the band. It extended the lyrical themes of the song by showing Tennant under arrest by an inquisition with Lowe as his jailer and Ron Moody in the role of his judge, interspersed with brief clips of personifications of the seven deadly sins.

Track listings
 7": Parlophone / R 6158 (UK)
 "It's a Sin" – 4:59
 "You Know Where You Went Wrong" – 5:51

 12": Parlophone / 12R 6158 (UK)
 "It's a Sin" (Disco Mix) – 7:39
 "You Know Where You Went Wrong" – 5:51
 "It's a Sin" (7" version) – 4:59

 CD: Parlophone / CDR 6158 (UK)
 "It's a Sin" (7" version) – 4:59
 "You Know Where You Went Wrong" – 5:51
 "It's a Sin" (Disco Mix) – 7:39

 12": Parlophone / 12RX 6158 (UK)
 "It's a Sin" (Remix) (Ian Levine) – 8:15
 "You Know Where You Went Wrong" (Rough Mix) – 6:38

 12": EMI-Manhattan / V-19256 (US)
 "It's a Sin" (Phil Harding Latin Vocal Mix) (aka Miami Mix) – 9:14
 "It's a Sin" (Phil Harding Latin Dub Mix) – 4:20
 "It's a Sin" (Remix) – 8:15
 "It's a Sin" (Disco Mix) – 7:39
 "You Know Where You Went Wrong" – 5:51

Charts

Weekly charts

Year-end charts

Certifications and sales

Other recordings

Years and Years version 

On 22 January 2021, British electronic group Years & Years covered the song to coincide with the release of the Channel 4 series It's a Sin, which stars frontman Olly Alexander in the lead role. The cover was produced by Mark Ralph, with part of the proceeds going to the George House Trust. The band had previously collaborated with the Pet Shop Boys on the 2019 single "Dreamland", and Alexander previewed his version for Neil Tennant prior to its release. A slowed-down version of the song with only piano accompaniment, the cover is in C minor at a tempo of 126 beats per minute. Pet Shop Boys praised the cover, calling it "beautiful". A music video was released, consisting of clips from It's a Sin. Alexander performed the song as part of the setlist for his 2022 Night Call Tour.

Elton John and Years and Years version 

A pre-recorded performance of the song by English musicians Elton John and Years & Years aired as part of the 2021 Brit Awards on 11 May 2021. Pet Shop Boys were scheduled to be a part of the performance, but were unable to do so due to a "contractual issue". The duet started as a slower piano track before transitioning into synth-pop with accompanying backup dancers and drag queens. A studio recording of the collaboration, produced by Stuart Price and the Pet Shop Boys, was released following the performance, with proceeds going to the Elton John AIDS Foundation. "It's a Sin" debuted at number 57 on the UK Singles Chart and at the top of The Official Big Top 40.

Gamma Ray version

Gamma Ray covered the song for their 1999 album Power Plant.

Pansy Division version

American queer pop punk band Pansy Division covered the song on their 2016 album Quite Contrary.

Notes

References
 Heath, Chris (2001). "It's a Sin". In Actually / Further Listening 1987–1988 [CD liner notes]. London: Pet Shop Boys Partnership.
 

1987 songs
1987 singles
Irish Singles Chart number-one singles
Number-one singles in Austria
Number-one singles in Denmark
Number-one singles in Finland
Number-one singles in Germany
Number-one singles in Norway
Number-one singles in Portugal
Number-one singles in South Africa
Number-one singles in Spain
Number-one singles in Sweden
Number-one singles in Switzerland
Number-one singles in Zimbabwe
Parlophone singles
Pet Shop Boys songs
Song recordings produced by Julian Mendelsohn
LGBT-related songs
Songs critical of religion
Songs written by Chris Lowe
Songs written by Neil Tennant
Songs involved in plagiarism controversies
UK Singles Chart number-one singles
Years & Years songs
Song recordings produced by Mark Ralph (record producer)
Polydor Records singles
Elton John songs
Male vocal duets
Song recordings produced by Stuart Price
EMI Records singles
Universal Music Group singles
Mercury Records singles